Draconibacterium orientale is a Gram-negative and facultatively anaerobic bacterium from the genus of Draconibacterium.

References

Bacteroidia
Bacteria described in 2014